R-class submarine may refer to:
British R-class submarine, a class of 12 small British diesel-electric submarines built for the Royal Navy during World War I
Italian R-class submarine, a group of submarines built for the Italian Royal Navy (Regia Marina Italiana) during World War II
Rainbow-class submarine, a Royal Navy  World War II submarine 
United States R-class submarine, a class of United States Navy submarines active from 1918 until 1945